Kleszczów  is a village in Bełchatów County, Łódź Voivodeship, in central Poland. It is the seat of the gmina (administrative district) called Gmina Kleszczów.

The village has an approximate population of 4,500.

Gallery

References

Villages in Bełchatów County
Piotrków Governorate
Łódź Voivodeship (1919–1939)